Iván Enrique Castillo (born May 30, 1995) is a Dominican professional baseball infielder who is a free agent. He has played in Major League Baseball (MLB) for the San Diego Padres. He signed with the Cleveland Indians as an international free agent in 2012.

Professional career

Cleveland Indians
On May 31, 2012, Castillo signed with the Cleveland Indians as an international free agent. He made his professional debut for the DSL Indians. In 2013, Castillo played for the rookie ball AZL Indians, batting .231/.258/.269 in 42 contests. He spent the 2014 season in Single-A with the Lake County Captains, slashing .260/.293/.365 with 5 home runs and 26 RBI. He played for the High-A Lynchburg Hillcats in 2015, hitting .249/.305/.347 with 20 stolen bases in 120 games. He split the 2016 season between Lynchburg, the Double-A Akron RubberDucks, and the Triple-A Columbus Clippers, accumulating a .192/.233/.268 batting line between the three clubs. In 2017, Castillo split the season between Akron and Lynchburg, batting .267/.341/.354 with 1 home run and 14 RBI in 56 games.

Toronto Blue Jays
On December 14, 2017, Castillo was selected in the minor league phase of the Rule 5 Draft by the Toronto Blue Jays. He spent the 2018 season in High-A with the Dunedin Blue Jays, batting .304/.345/.448 with 5 home runs and 44 RBI in 108 games. On November 2, 2018, he elected free agency.

San Diego Padres
On November 9, 2018, Castillo signed a minor league contract with the San Diego Padres organization. He began the 2019 season on the injured list due to a broken arm that he suffered in Spring Training and was assigned to the Double-A Amarillo Sod Poodles. In 2019, he hit a career-best .313/.347/.461 with career-highs in home runs (8) and RBI (57) in 104 games for Amarillo.

Castillo was invited to Spring Training for the Padres in 2020, but did not make the club. He did not play in a game in 2020 due to the cancellation of the minor league season because of the COVID-19 pandemic. He was assigned to the Triple-A El Paso Chihuahuas to begin the 2021 season, and hit .444/.516/.519 with 2 stolen bases in his first 7 games with the club.

On May 14, 2021, Castillo was selected to the 40-man roster and promoted to the major leagues for the first time. He made his MLB debut that day, replacing Tucupita Marcano at second base and going hitless in two at-bats. He appeared in three games for the Padres—singling in a run two days later in his only other plate appearance—before being sent back down to Triple-A El Paso, where he hit .287/.326/.366 in 113 games. On October 30, Castillo was outrighted off of the 40-man roster and elected free agency on November 7.

Kansas City Royals
On December 9, 2021, Castillo signed a minor league contract with the Kansas City Royals. He elected free agency on November 10, 2022.

See also
Rule 5 draft results

References

External links

Living people
1995 births
People from Santiago de los Caballeros
Dominican Republic expatriate baseball players in the United States
Major League Baseball players from the Dominican Republic
Major League Baseball infielders
San Diego Padres players
Dominican Summer League Indians players
Arizona League Indians players
Lake County Captains players
Lynchburg Hillcats players
Akron RubberDucks players
Columbus Clippers players
Dunedin Blue Jays players
Amarillo Sod Poodles players
Leones del Escogido players
El Paso Chihuahuas players